Creysseilles is a commune in the Ardèche department in southern France.

Population

See also 
 Communes of the Ardèche department

References 

Communes of Ardèche
Ardèche communes articles needing translation from French Wikipedia